Sphinganine C4-monooxygenase (sphingolipid C4-hydroxylase, SUR2 (gene), SBH1 (gene), SBH2 (gene)) is an enzyme with systematic name sphinganine,NADPH:oxygen oxidoreductase (C4-hydroxylating). This enzyme catalyses the following chemical reaction

 sphinganine + NADPH + H+ + O2  phytosphingosine + NADP+ + H2O

Sphinganine C4-monooxygenase is involved in the biosynthesis of sphingolipids in yeast and plants.

References

External links 
 

EC 1.14.13